Mikko Mutenia (3 February 1980 – 21 June 2015), better known by his stage name Ezkimo, was a Finnish hip hop musician. He died on 21 June 2015.

Discography

Albums 
 Iso E (2002)
 Vaa ämsee (2004)
 Muteniaatikot (2009)

Singles

Music videos 
 "Salainen agentti 998" (2000)
 "Näin on" (2001)
 "Entinen" (2002)
 "Bla bla bla" (2003)
 "Tytöt moi" (2005)

References

External links 
 
 

Finnish rappers
People from Inari, Finland
1980 births
2015 suicides
Suicides in Finland